CCACHE x Par Küp is a road cycling team founded in 2010 that is based in Australia. It competes in its home country as well as in the UCI Asia Tour. The team gained UCI Continental status for the 2018 season, but returned to club status during the COVID-19 Pandemic. It is managed by former rider Samuel Layzell and was originally founded in Newcastle, NSW. For season 2023 the team will operate under new naming rights sponsor CCACHE x Par Küp, regaining UCI Continental status.

Team history
The team had a breakthrough season in 2017. In January Logan Griffin took second place overall to Joseph Cooper at the New Zealand Cycle Classic. Sprinter Sean Whitfield then took the team's first Union Cyclist International win at the 2.2 ranked le Tour de Filipinas in February.

The mid-season recruitment of South African Brendon Davids helped continue the team's run of success. He took the team's first Australian National Road Series win at Battle Recharge in September. This was followed by a win for Davids in the General Classification at the Union Cycliste Internationale 2.2 ranked Jelajah Malaysia. Davids won stage 3 of the race with a solo breakaway, and clinched the overall classification by 24 seconds over Colombian Víctor Niño. Teammate Ryan Thomas won the youth classification at the event.

In 2019, William Hodges won the 59th edition of the Grafton to Inverell Cycle Classic.

Team roster

Major results
2018
Stage 1 New Zealand Cycle Classic, Nicholas Reddish
2019
Stage 4 New Zealand Cycle Classic, Jesse Featonby
Stage 2 PRUride PH, Brendon Davids
Stage 1 Tour of Indonesia, Angus Lyons

References

External links

UCI Continental Teams (Oceania)
Cycling teams based in Australia
Cycling teams established in 2010